Nias Regency is a regency in North Sumatra province, Indonesia; it lies on the east side of Nias Island. The regency originally covered the entire island, but was reduced to the northern half, with an area of 3,495.39 square kilometres, following the creation of the new regency of Nias Selatan in 2003. It was further reduced by the creation of the new regencies of Nias Utara and Nias Barat and the independent municipality of Gunungsitoli from other parts of Nias Regency on 29 October 2008. Since the separation of the new regencies and municipality, the reduced Regency now covers 853.42 km2 of land in the eastern part of the island (partly surrounding the coastal city of Gunungsitoli), and had a population of 131,377 at the 2010 Census and 146,672 at the 2020 Census. The official estimate as at mid 2021 was 147,794. Its seat is the town of Gido.

Administration 
The regency was previously divided administratively into 32 districts (kecamatan). However, following the creation of the new North Nias Regency, West Nias Regency and the newly independent city of Gunungsitoli, the residual Nias Regency was composed of only nine districts, although a tenth district (Sogaeadu) was created in 2012 from part of Gido district. These districts are tabulated below with their areas (in km2) and their 2010 Census and 2020 Census populations, together with the official estimates as at mid 2021. The table also includes the locations of the district administrative centres, the number of administrative villages (rural desa and urban kelurahan) in each district, and its postal code.

Note: (a) the population of Songaeadu in 2010 is included with the figure for Gido district (from which it was split in 2012).

References 

Regencies of North Sumatra